Aysel Tuğluk (born 17 July 1965 in Elâzığ, Turkey) is a Kurdish politician from Turkey and was a founding member of the Democratic Society Party (DTP) in Turkey. Aysel Tuğluk is currently imprisoned at the Kocaeli F-Type Prison, located near Istanbul.

Education and early life 
Tuğluk studied law at the Istanbul University from where she graduated and then worked as a lawyer. She was previously a member of the Social Law Researches Foundation Board Council. Beside being a member of the Turkish Human Rights Association (İHD), she is also a founding member of the Patriotic Women's Association (YKD).  In Abdullah Öcalan's appeal before the European Court of Human Rights (ECHR) against his verdict in Turkey, she acted as a lawyer for the defense.

Political career 
She was a candidate of the Thousand Hopes alliance in the elections to the Turkish Parliament in 2007, and was elected MP for Diyarbakır. Aysel Tuğluk's parliametary immunity prevented her going to prison due to a sentence of 1 year and 6 months imprisonment. But in December 2009 the Turkish Constitutional Court expelled her from the Grand National Assembly of Turkey and banned her from politics for five years. The Constitutional Court also closed the Democratic Society Party. The Constitutional Court's decision was based on a judgment that she and the DTP have affiliations with the Kurdistan Workers' Party (PKK), an organization that does not disavow violence for attaining political objectives. She and the DTP continued to deny such affiliations, and they opposed violence. Tuğluk was re-elected as an Member of Parliament in the 12 June 2011 general election having run as an independent.

Legal prosecution

Sentences of 2007 and 2009 
In 2007 she was sentenced to 18 months imprisonment over the distribution of party leaflets in the Kurdish language, which is forbidden according to the law, which requires all political literature be in Turkish. 

On 5 February 2009 Tuğluk was sentenced again, this time to 18 months in prison by a court in the southeastern city of Diyarbakir for violating anti-terrorism laws by referring to PKK fighters as 'heroes to some' at a rally in 2006.

Sentence of 2012 
In June 2012 Aysel Tuğluk was sentenced to 14 years and 7 months imprisonment for charges of "committing a crime on behalf of the armed terrorist organization PKK without being a member" and also for "making propaganda on behalf of a terrorist organization" for ten speeches she held.

Her lawyers argued that she held the speeches in the aim of fomenting fraternity and unity. The authorities just picked a few phrases they did not agree with. The defendants lawyers said they appealed the sentence at the Supreme Court of Appeals.

Sentences of 2018 and imprisonment 
On the 26 December 2016 she was arrested and in January 2018 sentenced to 1 year and 6 months in prison for “Opposing the law on rallies and demonstrations”. In March 2018 she was sentenced to another 10 years in prison for being a “leader of a terror organization”. It was argued that she took orders from Abdullah Öcalan, made statements to media outlets close to the PKK and attended funerals of “terrorists”. She denied being a member of a terrorist organization and that she was only a member of the Democratic Society Congress (DTK) and the Peoples' Democratic Party (Turkey), which are not terror organizations.

On 6 of September 2021 her lawyers have urged the Turkish legal authorities to ensure treatment following a statement regarding her currently undisclosed health issues while being imprisoned since 2016. The Forensic Medicine Institution concluded in their report that she ‘can stay in prison’. HDP's Ümit Dede statement highlighted the contradictions in the medical reports and that along with her lawyers have submitted an objection to the "Supreme Board of the Forensic Medicine Institution".

Kobani trial 
Since January 2021 Tuğluk is accused of having killed 37 times and tried to disrupt the unity of the state for having supported protests in October 2015 against a possible massacre in Kobani which was under the siege of the Islamic State together with other HDP politicians.

Release 
Since imprisoned, Tuğluk has been hospitalized twice and her health situation deteriorated until she was released in October 2022 after a report from the Forensic Medical Institute.

References

1965 births
People from Elazığ
Living people
21st-century Turkish women politicians
Democratic Society Party politicians
Istanbul University Faculty of Law alumni
Turkish women lawyers
Deputies of Diyarbakır
Peoples' Democratic Party (Turkey) politicians
Members of the 24th Parliament of Turkey
Members of the 23rd Parliament of Turkey
People expelled from public office
Politicians arrested in Turkey
Turkish Kurdish politicians
20th-century Turkish lawyers
21st-century Turkish lawyers